First Men's Basketball League is the is a 2nd-tier men's professional basketball competitions in Croatia. The league was founded in 2017 replacing the A2 Basketball League.

League champions are promoted to HT Premijer Liga and runners-up are playing playoffs with 11th placed team from HT Premijer Liga.

History

Current teams 
The following is the list of clubs for the 2022–23 season.

 Dubrovnik
 Hermes Analitica
 Jazine
 Kvarner 2010
 Mladost
 Omiš Galeb
 Ribola Kaštela
 Samobor
 Sonik-Puntamika
 Stoja
 Vrijednosnice Osijek
 Zagreb

References

External links 
 

Basketball leagues in Croatia
Professional sports leagues in Croatia
Second level basketball leagues in Europe